David Smith (born 26 December 1970) is a former professional footballer. He was a midfielder who played for Norwich City F.C. (where he began his career), Oxford United F.C., Stockport County F.C., Macclesfield Town F.C. and Drogheda United.

He came through the youth team and reserves at Norwich and played 18 times for the first team. His league debut was in April 1990 against Derby County. He played 198 times for Oxford (2 goals), and 60 games for Stockport.

External links
Career information at ex-canaries.co.uk

1970 births
Living people
English footballers
Premier League players
Norwich City F.C. players
Oxford United F.C. players
Stockport County F.C. players
Macclesfield Town F.C. players
Drogheda United F.C. players
League of Ireland players
Footballers from Liverpool
Association football midfielders
Expatriate association footballers in the Republic of Ireland